Göran Lundström is a Swedish make-up artist. He was nominated for two Academy Awards in the category Best Makeup and Hairstyling for the films Border and House of Gucci.

Selected filmography 
 Border (2018; co-nominated with Pamela Goldammer)
 House of Gucci (2021; co-nominated with Anna Carin Lock and Frederic Aspiras)

References

External links 

Living people
Year of birth missing (living people)
Place of birth missing (living people)
Swedish make-up artists